Gerley Ferreira de Souza (born 11 September 1990 in Central de Minas), simply known as Gerley, is a Brazilian footballer who plays as either a left back or an attacking midfielder for Portuguesa.

Career
Despite of being born in Minas Gerais state, Gerley started his professional career with Caxias of the state of Rio Grande do Sul. Soon he got the attention of the big Brazilian teams.

In 2011, he was voted as the best left back of the Campeonato Gaúcho with Caxias. On July he was transferred to Palmeiras of the Série A.

Honours
Bahia
Campeonato Baiano: 2012

References

External links
Globo Esporte
Profile at palmeiras.com

1990 births
Living people
Brazilian footballers
Association football defenders
Association football midfielders
Campeonato Brasileiro Série A players
Campeonato Brasileiro Série C players
Sociedade Esportiva e Recreativa Caxias do Sul players
Sociedade Esportiva Palmeiras players
Esporte Clube Bahia players
Ceará Sporting Club players
Esporte Clube Juventude players
Clube Náutico Capibaribe players
Madureira Esporte Clube players
Esporte Clube Democrata players
Botafogo Futebol Clube (SP) players
Clube Atlético Bragantino players
Associação Desportiva São Caetano players
Associação Portuguesa de Desportos players